Renato Marino Mazzacurati (22 July 1907 – 18 September 1969) was an Italian painter and sculptor belonging to the modern movement of the Scuola romana (Roman School), of eclectic styles and able within his career span to represent the artistic currents of Cubism, Expressionism, and Realism. He believed that art could sustain social functions.

Biography
Moved to Rome in 1926, he befriended Scipione, Mario Mafai and Raphaël, creating with them an artistic movement called by Italian scholar Roberto Longhi the Scuola di via Cavour or Scuola Romana.

In 1931 Mazzacurati went to Paris, where he became particularly interested in the works of Rodin, Matisse and  Picasso, as both his pictorial production (between 1931 and 1935) and his sculptures show. Their expressionism  emphasizes the physical structure, as in Ritratto del conte N. (Portrait of Count N., 1936), or deforms it into  monstrously grotesque figures – e.g., see Imperatori e Imperatrici (Emperors & Empresses, 1942–1943). Subsequently, Mazzacurati tended towards a cruder realism, joining in 1947 the "Fronte Nuovo delle Arti". His other works include Martyrs’ Monument in Beirut (1960), Monumento al Partigiano (Monumento to the Partisan) in Parma (1964) and the Monumento alle quattro giornate (Monument to the Four days of Naples) in Naples. His work was also part of the sculpture event in the art competition at the 1948 Summer Olympics.

See also
Scuola Romana
Expressionism
Realism (arts)
Cubism

Notes

Bibliography
G.C. Argan, Marino Mazzacurati on "Atti dell'Accademia Nazionale di S. Luca", Rome 1965-66
M. Maccari, Mazzacurati, catalogue, Accademia Nazionale di S. Luca, Rome 1966
V. Martinelli, "Scipione e Mazzacurati pittore", on Studi in onore di V. Viale, Turin 1967
Marino Mazzacurati, catalogue by the Municipality of Reggio Emilia 1983, with essays by R. De Grada, G.C. Argan, R. Guttuso, et al.
M. De Luca, V. Mazzarella, R. Ruscio, Il Museo Marino Mazzacurati (The Mazzacurati Museum), Reggio Emilia 1995

External links
 Mazzacurati on Artcyclopedia. Accessed 28/05/2011
 Monumento to the Partisan, image on Ilovefiguresculpture.com. Accessed 28/05/2011
 Fat man with child, image on Ilovefiguresculpture.com. Accessed 28/05/2011
 Artist's News, on Scuolaromana.it. Accessed 28/05/2011
 Lottatori (Wrestlers), sculpture (1943), image on Scuolaromana.it. Accessed 27/05/2011
 Ritratto di Scipione (Portrait of Scipione), oil on canvas  (1929), image on Scuolaromana.it. Accessed 27/05/2011
 Mazzacurati's Bio, on Scultura Italiana. Accessed 28/05/2011

1907 births
1969 deaths
20th-century Italian painters
Italian male painters
20th-century Italian sculptors
20th-century Italian male artists
Italian male sculptors
People from the Province of Bologna
Olympic competitors in art competitions